Luigi Cuppone (born 6 August 1997) is an Italian footballer who plays for  club Pescara on loan from Cittadella as a forward.

Professional career
Cuppone begun his career as a youth player for Lecce. He moved abroad to begin his professional career with the Swiss club Lugano in 2015. Cuppone made his professional debut for Vicenza in a 1-0 Serie B loss to Spezia on 18 May 2017.

On 17 January 2019, he joined Bisceglie on loan.

On 20 July 2019, he joined Monopoli on loan with an option to buy.

On 23 September 2020, he joined Casertana.

On 4 July 2021, he signed with Cittadella.

On 31 January 2022, Cuppone transferred to Potenza.

On 18 July 2022, Cuppone transferred to Pescara on loan with an obligation to buy.

References

External links
 
 
 Serie A Primavera Profile

1997 births
Living people
People from Nardò
Footballers from Apulia
Italian footballers
Association football forwards
FC Lugano players
L.R. Vicenza players
U.S. Triestina Calcio 1918 players
Pisa S.C. players
Paganese Calcio 1926 players
S.S. Monopoli 1966 players
Casertana F.C. players
A.S. Cittadella players
Potenza Calcio players
Delfino Pescara 1936 players
Serie B players
Serie C players
Serie D players
Italian expatriate footballers
Italian expatriate sportspeople in Switzerland
Expatriate footballers in Switzerland
Sportspeople from the Province of Lecce
21st-century Italian people